The 1955–56 season was the 54th in the history of the Western Football League.

The champions for the fourth time in their history were Trowbridge Town, and the winners of Division Two were the returning Torquay United Reserves.

Division One
Division One was reduced from eighteen to seventeen clubs after Ilfracombe Town and Street were relegated to Division Two, and Bath City Reserves left the league. Two clubs joined:

Frome Town, runners-up in Division Two
Yeovil Town Reserves, champions of Division Two

 No clubs were relegated from Division One this season.

Division Two
Division Two was increased from eighteen to twenty clubs after Frome Town and Yeovil Town Reserves were promoted to Division One, and four new clubs joined:

Frome Town Reserves
Ilfracombe Town, relegated from Division One.
Street, relegated from Division One.
Torquay United Reserves, rejoining after leaving the league in 1939.

References

1955-56
4